Mama Dracula is a 1980 Belgian comedy horror film co-written, produced and directed by Boris Szulzinger. The story relates how Mama Dracula (a character based on the life story of Countess Bathory), an enthusiast of rejuvenation baths consisting of the blood of young virgins, must come to terms with a shortage of such blood in the modern era.

Cast
 Louise Fletcher as Mama Dracula
 Maria Schneider as Nancy Hawaï
 Marc-Henri Wajnberg as Vladimir
 Alexander Wajnberg as Ladislas
 Jimmy Shuman as Professor Van Bloed
 Jess Hahn as The Detective
 Michel Israel as Rosa
 Suzy Falk as The Nanny
 Vincent Grass as Fiancé
 Marie-Françoise Manuel as Virginie
 José Gral as The Innkeeper
 William Del Visco as The psychiatrist

Soundtrack
The CD soundtrack composed by Roy Budd is available on Music Box Records label.

References

External links
 

1980 films
Belgian comedy horror films
French comedy horror films
1980s comedy horror films
1980s French-language films
English-language French films
Films directed by Boris Szulzinger
Films scored by Roy Budd
1980 comedy films
Cultural depictions of Elizabeth Báthory
1980s French films